Edward Bray(e) may refer to:
Edward Atkyns Bray (1778–1857), British poet, vicar, and miscellaneous writer
Edward Braye or Bray (died 1558), Member of Parliament (MP) for Lewes and Surrey
Edward Bray (died 1581) (1519–1581), MP for Helston
Edward Bray (Middlesex cricketer) (1874–1950)
Edward Bray (Surrey cricketer) (1849–1926)